Caroline Beaton (born 17 March 1969) is a British stand-up comedian, podcaster, writer and former TV executive.

Early life
Beaton grew up in Dorset, the daughter of two teachers and was the only girl in an all boys school. She studied English and Drama at Goldsmiths and is a Master Practitioner in neuro-linguistic programming.

Career
Beaton worked as a TV executive at MTV and Carlton TV responsible for shows including South Park and SpongeBob SquarePants and as a senior vice president at Viacom. While working at Comedy Central in 2015 she began performing as a stand-up comedian.

Beaton has appeared as a guest on BBC Two's The Apprentice: You're Fired, a panellist on BBC Two's QI, Richard Osman’s House of Games, BBC NI's The Blame Game and Live at the Apollo Christmas Special. She has been heard on BBC Radio 4's The Museum of Curiosity, The Unbelievable Truth, Radio 4's The Now Show'' and on BBC Radio 6, Times Radio, Radio 5 Live and BBC Radio London.

At the Edinburgh Festival Fringe in 2016, she gained 4-star reviews, together with comedian Catherine Bohart. For her solo show at the 2017 festival, Super Cally Fragile Lipstick, she gained further 4-star reviews and won the Piccadilly Comedy Club "New Comedian Of The Year" 2017/18.

Her 2019 Edinburgh Fringe solo show Invisible, inspired by the statement by Yann Moix that women over 50 years of age were invisible to him, was listed as unmissable by the Daily Express and received four-star reviews from The Scotsman and Funny Women. Beaton was on Episode 19 of the 2019 series of Richard Herring's Edinburgh Fringe Podcast. She featured on the Daily Mirrors and the Evening Standard's best jokes lists.

In Spring 2021, Beaton launched Namaste Motherf**kers, a podcast that mixes the genres of comedy, self-help and business. 

Beaton has also written for The Guardian and the Financial Times.

Personal life
Beaton has a son, who has Asperger syndrome, and a daughter. She spoke about her break up from her children's father on the podcast The Divorce Social''.

References

External links
 
 Performing Artists - Cally Beaton
 

1969 births
British stand-up comedians
English women comedians
British television executives
21st-century British writers
Living people
British women podcasters
British podcasters